The Clayton Elementary School and Auditorium are a historic school complex located at Clayton, Johnston County, North Carolina.  The elementary school was built in 1915, and is a two-story, rectangular brick building on a raised basement with a projecting one-story rear gymnasium.  The municipal auditorium was designed by architect Charles C. Hook and built in 1926.  It consists of a two-story, gable front auditorium on the front of the building, with a three-story classroom section at the rear. The classroom block contains 18 classrooms.  The school closed in 1997.

It was listed on the National Register of Historic Places in 2001.

References

School buildings on the National Register of Historic Places in North Carolina
Neoclassical architecture in North Carolina
School buildings completed in 1915
School buildings completed in 1926
Buildings and structures in Johnston County, North Carolina
National Register of Historic Places in Johnston County, North Carolina
1915 establishments in North Carolina